Norman Gray may refer to:

Norman Gray (Newfoundland politician) (1875–1952), Newfoundland merchant and politician
Norman B. Gray (1902–1976), Justice of the Wyoming Supreme Court
Norm Gray (1930–2008), Canadian ice hockey player